The Nayuma Museum is a museum in Mongu, Zambia, dedicated to promoting the arts and crafts of Barotseland.

References
Museums in Zambia

Museums in Zambia
Buildings and structures in Western Province, Zambia
Tourist attractions in Western Province, Zambia